Wimpole Village is a pre-school series which aired on Children's ITV. It ran for 16 episodes in 1987. The series is named after the creator's house, "Wimpole House".

The rights to Wimpole Village were acquired by Cameron Thomson Entertainment licensed the series to terrestrial television and cable
operators in North America and Europe. There has been talk of a rebooted series or possible reruns.

Content
The series focused around the inhabitants of a little village called Wimpole. All characters have names according to their profession.

Characters
Mayor Charlie Chambers - The mayor of Wimpole Village.
PC Crooknabber - The policeman.
Old Bill - PC Crooknabber's police dog.
Dennis Letterleaver - The postman.
Stamp - Dennis' post dog.
Ethel Doughkneader - The baker.
Ted Dripping - The butcher.
Captain Mainmast - The sea captain.
Harold Wholesome - The health food storekeeper.
Percy Pennywise - The general store keeper.
Hilda Halfpint - The milklady.
Ernie Porterline - The stationmaster.
Smokestack - Ernie's cat
Horace Hayseeder - The farm worker.
Father Away - The vicar.
Major Stickweilder - The retired militaryman.
The Breadsnapper Twins - Kyle and Nyle are the two twin boys.

Books
Similar to The Mr Men, several books were also created by studio publications, once again with pictures by Peter Kingston.

Videos

Over the course of 1989, Tempo and MSD Video released two video releases of the show.

On 4 March 1991, Tempo Pre-School (distributed by Abbey Home Entertainment) re-released the first Wimpole Village video with the same 8 episodes from it and a door plaque came free with the video inside its box.

Children's Compilations

In November 1989, Tempo Video (distributed by Wm. Collins) released a compilation video with a double bill of Wimpole Village containing "Nigel Notetaker" and "The Sea Rescue" together along with a double bill of Broomstick Cottage and a single episode each from Huxley Pig and The Herbs.

Between 1991 and 1994, episodes of Wimpole Village have been released on children's compilation videos released by Abbey Home Entertainment Distribution.

In October 1991, the "Haybarn Fire" episode of Wimpole Village was released on a single pre-school compilation which was exclusively sold and distributed under license from Abbey Home Entertainment by Entertainment UK Ltd (in its "Starvision" and "Funhouse" range of children's videos) along with Huxley Pig, Broomstick Cottage and Will Quack Quack.

As of 2022, there have been no DVD releases of the series.

External links
and crew at Toonhound.
Wimpole Village at Internet Movie Database

1987 British television series debuts
1987 British television series endings
1980s British children's television series
ITV children's television shows
British children's animated adventure television series
English-language television shows
1980s British animated television series